is a former international table tennis player from Japan.

Table tennis career
She won a gold medal in the women's team event at the World Table Tennis Championships in 1954.

In addition she won six other World Championship medals; one in the singles, two in the doubles, one in the mixed doubles and two in the team event.

See also
 List of table tennis players
 List of World Table Tennis Championships medalists

References

Japanese female table tennis players